Marita Jane Grabiak (born in Ambridge, Pennsylvania) is an American television director.  She began her career as a production assistant on the film The Men's Club (1986) along with fellow Joss Whedon collaborator Tim Minear. She has directed episodes of several television series including Dawson's Creek, Dollhouse, ER, Firefly, Buffy the Vampire Slayer, Angel, Smallville, Cold Case, Gilmore Girls, Everwood, Battlestar Galactica, Lost, The Inside, Alias, Law & Order: Special Victims Unit, Point Pleasant, One Tree Hill, American Horror Story, V Wars, 9-1-1: Lone Star, 9-1-1, Siren and The Order 

She is a graduate of UCLA.

References

External links

American television directors
American women television directors
Living people
People from Ambridge, Pennsylvania
University of California, Los Angeles alumni
Year of birth missing (living people)